is a Japanese manga artist from Mie prefecture. He has published his works in a number of Shogakukan manga magazines, including Shonen Sunday, Young Sunday, and Big Comic Superior.

His best-known published manga is Tuxedo Gin. Also, he was formerly an assistant to Tatsuya Egawa.

Works 
 
 
 
 . written by Buronson
 BROTHER's
 . written by Dankan

References

1968 births
Manga artists
Living people